Portrait of Clemenceau is an oil painting on canvas of 1879–80 by Édouard Manet, now in the Musée d'Orsay. The work can be dated via two letters of 9 December 1879 and 8 January 1880 from their subject fixing sitting dates. Clemenceau was not happy with the work, stating "My portrait by Manet? Very bad, I don't have it and I don't mind that. It is at the Louvre, I ask myself why we put it there". But he enjoyed the sittings at Manet's home, enjoying the conversation and finding the painter very spiritual.

Manet's youngest brother Gustave was a municipal councillor in Paris and it may have been through his mediation that Manet met Clemenceau. Alternatively, the pair may have met at the home of Paul Meurice or Émile Zola. On Manet's death his daughter Suzanne gave the work to its subject. When Mary Cassatt brought her American friend Louisine Havemeyer to Clemenceau's home, Louisine sold her the work for 10000 francs in 1905. Madame Havemeyer then donated it to the Musée du Louvre in 1927, from which it was later assigned to its present home.

See also
 Portrait of Clemenceau (Manet, Fort Worth), Manet's larger 1872 work

References

Bibliography
 
 
 Adolphe Tabarant, Les Manet de la collection Havemeyer: La Renaissance de l'art français, Paris, 1930, XIII éd.
 Étienne Moreau-Nélaton, Manet raconté par lui-même, vol. 2, t. I, Paris, Henri Laurens, 1926

Clemenceau
1879 paintings
1880 paintings
Clemenceau
Clemenceau
Georges Clemenceau
Paintings in the collection of the Musée d'Orsay